Marcel Tuihani is a French politician and was the president of the Assembly of French Polynesia from 16 September 2014 to 17 May 2018.

In December 2022 he was a founding member of the newly-formed Ia Ora te Nuna'a party. In January 2023 he quit the party, saying that it was not organised enough to contest the election.

References

Living people
1971 births
Speakers of the Assembly of French Polynesia
Tahoera'a Huiraatira politicians
People from Tahiti